Lamar station may refer to:
Lamar station (Amtrak), station in Lamar, Colorado
Lamar station (RTD), station in Lakewood, Colorado